Subhash Gangoli (born 1968) is an Indian politician who is serving as a Member of the Haryana Legislative Assembly. He is elected from the Safidon Assembly constituency representing the Indian National Congress. He was elected in 2019. He fought in 2019 for the first time in his life.

Early life and education 
Subhash Gangoli was born in 1968 in Jind,  Haryana to Ruldu.

Gangoli did M. A In Hindi from Kurukshetra Univeristy in 1989.

References 

Living people
1968 births
People from Jind
Indian National Congress politicians from Haryana
Haryana MLAs 2019–2024